The 1945 Pittsburgh Pirates season was the 64th season of the Pittsburgh Pirates franchise; the 59th in the National League. The Pirates finished fourth in the league standings with a record of 82–72.

Offseason 
 Prior to 1945 season: Tod Davis was acquired by the Pirates from the Hollywood Stars as part of a minor league working agreement.

Regular season

Season standings

Record vs. opponents

Game log

|- bgcolor="ffbbbb"
| 1 || April 17 || @ Reds || 6–7 (11) || Lisenbee || Sewell (0–1) || — || 30,126 || 0–1
|- bgcolor="ffbbbb"
| 2 || April 18 || @ Reds || 0–6 || Heusser || Strincevich (0–1) || — || 1,467 || 0–2
|- bgcolor="ccffcc"
| 3 || April 19 || @ Reds || 5–1 || Butcher (1–0) || Beck || — || 1,106 || 1–2
|- bgcolor="ccffcc"
| 4 || April 20 || Cubs || 5–4 || Sewell (1–1) || Wyse || — || 9,449 || 2–2
|- bgcolor="ffbbbb"
| 5 || April 21 || Cubs || 3–4 || Derringer || Roe (0–1) || — || 3,891 || 2–3
|- bgcolor="ffbbbb"
| 6 || April 22 || Cubs || 0–3 || Chipman || Ostermueller (0–1) || — || — || 2–4
|- bgcolor="ffbbbb"
| 7 || April 22 || Cubs || 2–5 || Prim || Gerheauser (0–1) || — || 27,690 || 2–5
|- bgcolor="ffbbbb"
| 8 || April 27 || @ Cubs || 3–7 || Derringer || Sewell (1–2) || — || 4,655 || 2–6
|- bgcolor="ffbbbb"
| 9 || April 28 || @ Cubs || 0–6 || Wyse || Butcher (1–1) || — || 5,708 || 2–7
|- bgcolor="ccffcc"
| 10 || April 29 || @ Cubs || 6–2 || Roe (1–1) || Chipman || — || — || 3–7
|- bgcolor="ccffcc"
| 11 || April 29 || @ Cubs || 5–4 || Strincevich (1–1) || Comellas || Rescigno (1) || 36,637 || 4–7
|-

|- bgcolor="ffbbbb"
| 12 || May 2 || Cardinals || 2–4 || Brecheen || Sewell (1–3) || — || 6,000 || 4–8
|- bgcolor="ccffcc"
| 13 || May 2 || Cardinals || 11–1 || Butcher (2–1) || Donnelly || — || 6,159 || 5–8
|- bgcolor="ffbbbb"
| 14 || May 6 || Reds || 1–3 || Heusser || Butcher (2–2) || — || — || 5–9
|- bgcolor="ccffcc"
| 15 || May 6 || Reds || 5–1 || Sewell (2–3) || Walters || — || 10,157 || 6–9
|- bgcolor="ccffcc"
| 16 || May 9 || @ Braves || 9–5 || Roe (2–1) || Tobin || Rescigno (2) || 2,574 || 7–9
|- bgcolor="ccffcc"
| 17 || May 12 || @ Phillies || 5–3 || Strincevich (2–1) || Barrett || Rescigno (3) || 2,693 || 8–9
|- bgcolor="ccffcc"
| 18 || May 13 || @ Phillies || 9–6 || Sewell (3–3) || Schanz || — || — || 9–9
|- bgcolor="ffbbbb"
| 19 || May 13 || @ Phillies || 5–6 || Lee || Starr (0–1) || Sproull || 10,402 || 9–10
|- bgcolor="ffbbbb"
| 20 || May 14 || @ Dodgers || 1–4 || Pfund || Roe (2–2) || — || 7,343 || 9–11
|- bgcolor="ffbbbb"
| 21 || May 15 || @ Dodgers || 3–6 || Lombardi || Cuccurullo (0–1) || — || 25,828 || 9–12
|- bgcolor="ffbbbb"
| 22 || May 16 || @ Dodgers || 1–3 || Gregg || Gerheauser (0–2) || — || 7,352 || 9–13
|- bgcolor="ccffcc"
| 23 || May 17 || @ Dodgers || 12–3 || Strincevich (3–1) || Seats || — || 6,575 || 10–13
|- bgcolor="ffbbbb"
| 24 || May 20 || @ Giants || 1–5 || Voiselle || Sewell (3–4) || — || — || 10–14
|- bgcolor="ccffcc"
| 25 || May 20 || @ Giants || 4–0 || Roe (3–2) || Feldman || — || — || 11–14
|- bgcolor="ccffcc"
| 26 || May 21 || Giants || 5–2 || Butcher (3–2) || Hansen || — || 21,682 || 12–14
|- bgcolor="ccffcc"
| 27 || May 23 || Braves || 9–8 (13) || Sewell (4–4) || Hutchings || — || 10,106 || 13–14
|- bgcolor="ccffcc"
| 28 || May 24 || Braves || 10–9 (11) || Gables (1–0) || Logan || — || — || 14–14
|- bgcolor="ccffcc"
| 29 || May 25 || Braves || 5–3 || Roe (4–2) || Tobin || — || 2,768 || 15–14
|- bgcolor="ccffcc"
| 30 || May 27 || Giants || 16–4 || Sewell (5–4) || Voiselle || — || — || 16–14
|- bgcolor="ccffcc"
| 31 || May 27 || Giants || 11–5 || Rescigno (1–0) || Fischer || — || 29,121 || 17–14
|- bgcolor="ccffcc"
| 32 || May 29 || Giants || 4–3 || Gables (2–0) || Adams || — || — || 18–14
|- bgcolor="ccffcc"
| 33 || May 30 || Dodgers || 13–5 || Sewell (6–4) || Seats || — || — || 19–14
|- bgcolor="ffbbbb"
| 34 || May 30 || Dodgers || 10–14 || Pfund || Rescigno (1–1) || Gregg || 27,029 || 19–15
|- bgcolor="ffbbbb"
| 35 || May 31 || Dodgers || 4–6 (13) || King || Strincevich (3–2) || — || 13,126 || 19–16
|-

|- bgcolor="ccffcc"
| 36 || June 1 || Phillies || 6–5 || Butcher (4–2) || Karl || — || 1,513 || 20–16
|- bgcolor="ccffcc"
| 37 || June 2 || Phillies || 7–6 || Gerheauser (1–2) || Coffman || Rescigno (4) || 2,695 || 21–16
|- bgcolor="ccffcc"
| 38 || June 3 || Phillies || 7–6 (10) || Cuccurullo (1–1) || Judd || — || — || 22–16
|- bgcolor="ffbbbb"
| 39 || June 3 || Phillies || 9–11 || Karl || Cuccurullo (1–2) || — || 9,086 || 22–17
|- bgcolor="ffbbbb"
| 40 || June 5 || Reds || 0–4 || Heusser || Strincevich (3–3) || — || — || 22–18
|- bgcolor="ccffcc"
| 41 || June 5 || Reds || 9–1 || Butcher (5–2) || Beck || — || 2,634 || 23–18
|- bgcolor="ffbbbb"
| 42 || June 6 || Reds || 0–3 || Walters || Roe (4–3) || — || 13,277 || 23–19
|- bgcolor="ffbbbb"
| 43 || June 7 || Reds || 3–7 || Bowman || Sewell (6–5) || — || 2,954 || 23–20
|- bgcolor="ffbbbb"
| 44 || June 8 || @ Cardinals || 3–4 (13) || Burkhart || Gerheauser (1–3) || — || 3,695 || 23–21
|- bgcolor="ccffcc"
| 45 || June 9 || @ Cardinals || 5–1 || Strincevich (4–3) || Barrett || — || 5,195 || 24–21
|- bgcolor="ccffcc"
| 46 || June 10 || @ Cardinals || 8–6 (10) || Sewell (7–5) || Brecheen || — || — || 25–21
|- bgcolor="ccffcc"
| 47 || June 10 || @ Cardinals || 4–1 (10) || Roe (5–3) || Burkhart || — || 13,794 || 26–21
|- bgcolor="ccffcc"
| 48 || June 12 || Cubs || 9–3 || Gerheauser (2–3) || Wyse || — || 15,126 || 27–21
|- bgcolor="ccffcc"
| 49 || June 14 || Cubs || 5–2 || Butcher (6–2) || Chipman || — || — || 28–21
|- bgcolor="ccffcc"
| 50 || June 14 || Cubs || 6–5 || Sewell (8–5) || Derringer || Rescigno (5) || 12,880 || 29–21
|- bgcolor="ccffcc"
| 51 || June 15 || Cardinals || 5–2 || Strincevich (5–3) || Barrett || — || 24,315 || 30–21
|- bgcolor="ffbbbb"
| 52 || June 16 || Cardinals || 10–13 || Byerly || Starr (0–2) || Donnelly || 6,019 || 30–22
|- bgcolor="ffbbbb"
| 53 || June 17 || Cardinals || 0–7 || Burkhart || Sewell (8–6) || — || — || 30–23
|- bgcolor="ffbbbb"
| 54 || June 17 || Cardinals || 2–6 || Wilks || Gerheauser (2–4) || — || — || 30–24
|- bgcolor="ffbbbb"
| 55 || June 20 || @ Cubs || 3–5 || Passeau || Butcher (6–3) || — || — || 30–25
|- bgcolor="ffbbbb"
| 56 || June 21 || @ Cubs || 4–5 || Wyse || Roe (5–4) || — || 10,123 || 30–26
|- bgcolor="ccffcc"
| 57 || June 22 || @ Reds || 3–1 || Strincevich (6–3) || Heusser || — || 5,814 || 31–26
|- bgcolor="ccffcc"
| 58 || June 24 || @ Reds || 7–5 || Sewell (9–6) || Riddle || Strincevich (1) || — || 32–26
|- bgcolor="ffbbbb"
| 59 || June 24 || @ Reds || 3–4 || Bowman || Butcher (6–4) || — || 11,732 || 32–27
|- bgcolor="ffbbbb"
| 60 || June 27 || @ Giants || 4–10 || Mungo || Gerheauser (2–5) || — || — || 32–28
|- bgcolor="ffbbbb"
| 61 || June 27 || @ Giants || 2–3 || Brewer || Roe (5–5) || — || 17,735 || 32–29
|- bgcolor="ccffcc"
| 62 || June 28 || @ Giants || 3–1 || Strincevich (7–3) || Feldman || — || 22,321 || 33–29
|- bgcolor="ffbbbb"
| 63 || June 29 || @ Giants || 2–3 || Adams || Butcher (6–5) || — || 3,779 || 33–30
|- bgcolor="ffbbbb"
| 64 || June 30 || @ Dodgers || 5–8 || Herring || Sewell (9–7) || King || 23,736 || 33–31
|-

|- bgcolor="ccffcc"
| 65 || July 1 || @ Dodgers || 4–3 || Roe (6–5) || Gregg || Cuccurullo (1) || — || 34–31
|- bgcolor="ffbbbb"
| 66 || July 1 || @ Dodgers || 2–4 || Davis || Gerheauser (2–6) || — || 23,370 || 34–32
|- bgcolor="ccffcc"
| 67 || July 3 || @ Phillies || 10–3 || Strincevich (8–3) || Barrett || — || — || 35–32
|- bgcolor="ffbbbb"
| 68 || July 4 || @ Phillies || 6–7 || Kraus || Rescigno (1–2) || Schanz || — || 35–33
|- bgcolor="ccffcc"
| 69 || July 4 || @ Phillies || 13–0 || Butcher (7–5) || Judd || — || 14,334 || 36–33
|- bgcolor="ffbbbb"
| 70 || July 6 || @ Braves || 5–13 || Andrews || Rescigno (1–3) || Cooper || — || 36–34
|- bgcolor="ffbbbb"
| 71 || July 6 || @ Braves || 8–14 || Hendrickson || Roe (6–6) || — || 8,025 || 36–35
|- bgcolor="ffbbbb"
| 72 || July 7 || @ Braves || 6–7 || Cooper || Gerheauser (2–7) || — || 5,159 || 36–36
|- bgcolor="ccffcc"
| 73 || July 8 || @ Braves || 10–8 || Gables (3–0) || Andrews || Sewell (1) || — || 37–36
|- bgcolor="ffbbbb"
| 74 || July 8 || @ Braves || 1–13 || Tobin || Butcher (7–6) || — || 25,317 || 37–37
|- bgcolor="ccffcc"
| 75 || July 12 || Phillies || 4–0 || Strincevich (9–3) || Kraus || — || 15,044 || 38–37
|- bgcolor="ccffcc"
| 76 || July 13 || Phillies || 3–2 (10) || Butcher (8–6) || Barrett || — || 3,660 || 39–37
|- bgcolor="ccffcc"
| 77 || July 15 || Dodgers || 9–1 || Sewell (10–7) || Lombardi || — || — || 40–37
|- bgcolor="ccffcc"
| 78 || July 15 || Dodgers || 15–3 || Gables (4–0) || Gregg || — || 24,129 || 41–37
|- bgcolor="ffbbbb"
| 79 || July 16 || Dodgers || 4–8 || Seats || Rescigno (1–4) || — || 3,162 || 41–38
|- bgcolor="ffbbbb"
| 80 || July 17 || Dodgers || 2–5 || Gregg || Strincevich (9–4) || Herring || 20,148 || 41–39
|- bgcolor="ffbbbb"
| 81 || July 18 || Giants || 3–6 || Brewer || Roe (6–7) || Adams || — || 41–40
|- bgcolor="ffbbbb"
| 82 || July 18 || Giants || 3–4 || Fischer || Butcher (8–7) || Adams || 6,253 || 41–41
|- bgcolor="ccffcc"
| 83 || July 19 || Giants || 4–0 || Sewell (11–7) || Feldman || — || 14,168 || 42–41
|- bgcolor="ccffcc"
| 84 || July 20 || Giants || 13–5 || Beck (1–0) || Voiselle || Roe (1) || 3,210 || 43–41
|- bgcolor="ffbbbb"
| 85 || July 21 || Braves || 1–5 || Lee || Gerheauser (2–8) || — || — || 43–42
|- bgcolor="ccffcc"
| 86 || July 21 || Braves || 3–1 || Strincevich (10–4) || Logan || — || 8,173 || 44–42
|- bgcolor="ccffcc"
| 87 || July 22 || Braves || 2–1 || Gables (5–0) || Tobin || — || — || 45–42
|- bgcolor="ccffcc"
| 88 || July 22 || Braves || 3–1 || Roe (7–7) || Andrews || — || 19,184 || 46–42
|- bgcolor="ccffcc"
| 89 || July 23 || Braves || 8–5 || Beck (2–0) || Hutchings || Strincevich (2) || 3,163 || 47–42
|- bgcolor="ccffcc"
| 90 || July 24 || Braves || 6–5 (11) || Gables (6–0) || Hendrickson || — || 20,168 || 48–42
|- bgcolor="ffbbbb"
| 91 || July 26 || @ Cardinals || 2–10 || Burkhart || Strincevich (10–5) || — || 9,213 || 48–43
|- bgcolor="ffbbbb"
| 92 || July 27 || @ Cardinals || 0–2 || Donnelly || Roe (7–8) || — || 4,948 || 48–44
|- bgcolor="ffbbbb"
| 93 || July 28 || @ Cardinals || 0–2 || Barrett || Gables (6–1) || — || 9,242 || 48–45
|- bgcolor="ccffcc"
| 94 || July 29 || @ Cardinals || 9–6 (10) || Gerheauser (3–8) || Barrett || — || — || 49–45
|- bgcolor="ffbbbb"
| 95 || July 29 || @ Cardinals || 4–6 || Dockins || Strincevich (10–6) || — || 15,971 || 49–46
|-

|- bgcolor="ccffcc"
| 96 || August 1 || @ Cubs || 1–0 || Butcher (9–7) || Passeau || — || 17,780 || 50–46
|- bgcolor="ffbbbb"
| 97 || August 2 || @ Cubs || 0–1 || Derringer || Roe (7–9) || — || 18,535 || 50–47
|- bgcolor="ffbbbb"
| 98 || August 3 || Cardinals || 1–5 || Dockins || Gables (6–2) || — || 22,218 || 50–48
|- bgcolor="ffbbbb"
| 99 || August 4 || Cardinals || 5–6 || Brecheen || Gerheauser (3–9) || — || 5,280 || 50–49
|- bgcolor="ffbbbb"
| 100 || August 5 || Cardinals || 3–10 || Barrett || Butcher (9–8) || — || — || 50–50
|- bgcolor="ccffcc"
| 101 || August 5 || Cardinals || 12–5 || Ostermueller (1–1) || Burkhart || Gables (1) || 22,105 || 51–50
|- bgcolor="ccffcc"
| 102 || August 8 || @ Phillies || 4–0 || Roe (8–9) || Kraus || — || — || 52–50
|- bgcolor="ffbbbb"
| 103 || August 8 || @ Phillies || 0–5 || Mauney || Cuccurullo (1–3) || — || 6,630 || 52–51
|- bgcolor="ccffcc"
| 104 || August 9 || @ Phillies || 3–1 || Gables (7–2) || Barrett || — || 5,017 || 53–51
|- bgcolor="ccffcc"
| 105 || August 10 || @ Phillies || 10–2 || Ostermueller (2–1) || Schanz || — || — || 54–51
|- bgcolor="ffbbbb"
| 106 || August 10 || @ Phillies || 1–6 || Judd || Strincevich (10–7) || — || 5,728 || 54–52
|- bgcolor="ffbbbb"
| 107 || August 12 || @ Braves || 6–7 || Hendrickson || Gerheauser (3–10) || — || — || 54–53
|- bgcolor="ccffcc"
| 108 || August 12 || @ Braves || 3–0 || Roe (9–9) || Wright || — || 14,961 || 55–53
|- bgcolor="ffbbbb"
| 109 || August 13 || @ Braves || 4–6 || Andrews || Gables (7–3) || Hendrickson || 2,095 || 55–54
|- bgcolor="ccffcc"
| 110 || August 14 || @ Braves || 7–5 (10) || Ostermueller (3–1) || Hendrickson || — || — || 56–54
|- bgcolor="ccffcc"
| 111 || August 14 || @ Braves || 6–2 || Beck (3–0) || Javery || — || 4,542 || 57–54
|- bgcolor="ccffcc"
| 112 || August 15 || @ Giants || 11–9 || Gables (8–3) || Feldman || Gerheauser (1) || — || 58–54
|- bgcolor="ccffcc"
| 113 || August 15 || @ Giants || 3–2 || Strincevich (11–7) || Zabala || — || 18,822 || 59–54
|- bgcolor="ffbbbb"
| 114 || August 16 || @ Giants || 1–2 || Mungo || Roe (9–10) || Adams || 22,807 || 59–55
|- bgcolor="ffbbbb"
| 115 || August 17 || @ Giants || 2–3 || Brewer || Gables (8–4) || — || 3,834 || 59–56
|- bgcolor="ffbbbb"
| 116 || August 18 || @ Giants || 0–6 || Maglie || Rescigno (1–5) || — || 10,126 || 59–57
|- bgcolor="ffbbbb"
| 117 || August 19 || @ Dodgers || 2–6 || Webber || Ostermueller (3–2) || — || — || 59–58
|- bgcolor="ccffcc"
| 118 || August 19 || @ Dodgers || 4–2 || Strincevich (12–7) || Branca || — || 19,422 || 60–58
|- bgcolor="ccffcc"
| 119 || August 20 || @ Dodgers || 11–1 || Roe (10–10) || Seats || — || 6,322 || 61–58
|- bgcolor="ccffcc"
| 120 || August 21 || @ Dodgers || 12–1 || Gables (9–4) || Gregg || — || 5,484 || 62–58
|- bgcolor="ccffcc"
| 121 || August 23 || Reds || 6–2 || Beck (4–0) || Harrist || — || 1,567 || 63–58
|- bgcolor="ffbbbb"
| 122 || August 24 || Reds || 1–2 || Heusser || Strincevich (12–8) || — || 12,923 || 63–59
|- bgcolor="ffbbbb"
| 123 || August 25 || Reds || 0–1 || Kennedy || Roe (10–11) || — || 3,402 || 63–60
|- bgcolor="ccffcc"
| 124 || August 26 || Reds || 10–7 || Rescigno (2–5) || Fox || — || 527 || 64–60
|- bgcolor="ccffcc"
| 125 || August 26 || Reds || 2–1 || Gables (10–4) || Bowman || — || 14,193 || 65–60
|- bgcolor="ffbbbb"
| 126 || August 28 || Cubs || 3–6 || Borowy || Ostermueller (3–3) || — || 23,335 || 65–61
|- bgcolor="ffbbbb"
| 127 || August 29 || Cubs || 0–2 || Prim || Strincevich (12–9) || Vandenberg || 4,881 || 65–62
|- bgcolor="ccffcc"
| 128 || August 30 || Cubs || 6–4 || Roe (11–11) || Erickson || Rescigno (6) || — || 66–62
|- bgcolor="ccffcc"
| 129 || August 31 || @ Reds || 6–5 || Gables (11–4) || Bowman || Rescigno (7) || 4,499 || 67–62
|-

|- bgcolor="ccffcc"
| 130 || September 2 || @ Reds || 4–2 || Beck (5–0) || Bowman || — || — || 68–62
|- bgcolor="ccffcc"
| 131 || September 2 || @ Reds || 7–3 || Strincevich (13–9) || Walters || — || 9,810 || 69–62
|- bgcolor="ccffcc"
| 132 || September 3 || @ Cardinals || 6–5 || Ostermueller (4–3) || Wilks || Rescigno (8) || — || 70–62
|- bgcolor="ccffcc"
| 133 || September 3 || @ Cardinals || 6–2 || Roe (12–11) || Donnelly || — || 19,492 || 71–62
|- bgcolor="ffffff"
| 134 || September 4 || @ Cardinals || 8–8 (12) ||  ||  || — || 1,755 || 71–62
|- bgcolor="ffbbbb"
| 135 || September 5 || Dodgers || 3–5 (10) || Lombardi || Gables (11–5) || — || 19,504 || 71–63
|- bgcolor="ccffcc"
| 136 || September 6 || Dodgers || 17–5 || Strincevich (14–9) || Gregg || — || 1,885 || 72–63
|- bgcolor="ffbbbb"
| 137 || September 7 || Dodgers || 2–3 || Seats || Roe (12–12) || Herring || 1,874 || 72–64
|- bgcolor="ccffcc"
| 138 || September 8 || Dodgers || 6–5 (12) || Gerheauser (4–10) || King || — || 3,550 || 73–64
|- bgcolor="ccffcc"
| 139 || September 9 || Phillies || 4–3 || Beck (6–0) || Kraus || — || — || 74–64
|- bgcolor="ffbbbb"
| 140 || September 9 || Phillies || 3–14 || Mauney || Sewell (11–8) || Karl || 5,525 || 74–65
|- bgcolor="ccffcc"
| 141 || September 10 || Phillies || 9–5 (7) || Strincevich (15–9) || Leon || — || 6,000 || 75–65
|- bgcolor="ccffcc"
| 142 || September 11 || Phillies || 5–4 (10) || Rescigno (3–5) || Schanz || — || — || 76–65
|- bgcolor="ccffcc"
| 143 || September 11 || Phillies || 5–1 || Butcher (10–8) || Sproull || Rescigno (9) || 2,047 || 77–65
|- bgcolor="ccffcc"
| 144 || September 13 || Braves || 4–3 || Gerheauser (5–10) || Singleton || — || — || 78–65
|- bgcolor="ccffcc"
| 145 || September 13 || Braves || 2–0 || Ostermueller (5–3) || Whitcher || — || 3,836 || 79–65
|- bgcolor="ffbbbb"
| 146 || September 15 || Giants || 5–9 || Zabala || Strincevich (15–10) || — || 411 || 79–66
|- bgcolor="ccffcc"
| 147 || September 16 || Giants || 3–2 || Roe (13–12) || Maglie || — || — || 80–66
|- bgcolor="ffbbbb"
| 148 || September 16 || Giants || 2–9 || Brewer || Gables (11–6) || — || 15,175 || 80–67
|- bgcolor="ffbbbb"
| 149 || September 23 || @ Cubs || 3–7 || Wyse || Roe (13–13) || — || 43,755 || 80–68
|- bgcolor="ffbbbb"
| 150 || September 26 || @ Reds || 2–5 || Hetki || Beck (6–1) || — || — || 80–69
|- bgcolor="ccffcc"
| 151 || September 26 || @ Reds || 2–1 || Strincevich (16–10) || Harrist || — || 715 || 81–69
|- bgcolor="ccffcc"
| 152 || September 27 || Cardinals || 5–2 || Roe (14–13) || Dockins || — || 9,603 || 82–69
|- bgcolor="ffbbbb"
| 153 || September 29 || Cubs || 3–4 || Borowy || Ostermueller (5–4) || Erickson || — || 82–70
|- bgcolor="ffbbbb"
| 154 || September 29 || Cubs || 0–5 (7) || Vandenberg || Sewell (11–9) || Warneke || 4,016 || 82–71
|- bgcolor="ffbbbb"
| 155 || September 30 || Cubs || 3–5 || Chipman || Gables (11–7) || Erickson || 3,751 || 82–72
|-

|-
| Legend:       = Win       = Loss       = TieBold = Pirates team member

Opening Day lineup

Roster

Player stats

Batting

Starters by position 
Note: Pos = Position; G = Games played; AB = At bats; H = Hits; Avg. = Batting average; HR = Home runs; RBI = Runs batted in

Other batters 
Note: G = Games played; AB = At bats; H = Hits; Avg. = Batting average; HR = Home runs; RBI = Runs batted in

Pitching

Starting pitchers 
Note: G = Games pitched; IP = Innings pitched; W = Wins; L = Losses; ERA = Earned run average; SO = Strikeouts

Other pitchers 
Note: G = Games pitched; IP = Innings pitched; W = Wins; L = Losses; ERA = Earned run average; SO = Strikeouts

Relief pitchers 
Note: G = Games pitched; W = Wins; L = Losses; SV = Saves; ERA = Earned run average; SO = Strikeouts

Farm system

LEAGUE CHAMPIONS: Albany

Notes

References 
 1945 Pittsburgh Pirates team page at Baseball Reference
 1945 Pittsburgh Pirates Page at Baseball Almanac

Pittsburgh Pirates seasons
Pittsburgh Pirates season
Pittsburg Pir